The People's Party of Navarre (PP) is the regional section of the People's Party (PP) in Navarre. It was first formed in 1989 from the re-foundation of the People's Alliance, and in 1991 it was merged into the Navarrese People's Union (UPN). In 2008, after a crisis erupted between both parties, the PP choose to re-create their regional branch in the community.

Electoral performance

Parliament of Navarre

References

People's Party (Spain)
Political parties in Navarre